Jordán Vallmajo (14 May 1894 – 22 August 1983) was a Spanish wrestler. He competed in the Greco-Roman featherweight event at the 1924 Summer Olympics.

References

External links
 

1894 births
1983 deaths
Olympic wrestlers of Spain
Wrestlers at the 1924 Summer Olympics
Spanish male sport wrestlers
Sportspeople from Girona